The 1985 NCAA Men's Water Polo Championship was the 17th annual NCAA Men's Water Polo Championship to determine the national champion of NCAA men's collegiate water polo. Tournament matches were played at the Belmont Plaza Pool in Long Beach, California during December 1985.

Stanford defeated UC Irvine in the final, 12–11 (in two overtimes), to win their fifth national title. This was a rematch of the 1982 championship match, won by UC Irvine. Coached by Dante Dettamanti, the Cardinal finished the season 25–4.

Jeff Campbell (UC Irvine) and David Imbernino (Stanford) were named the Most Outstanding Players of the tournament. An All-Tournament Team, consisting of eight players, was also named. 

The tournament's leading scorer was J.R. Salvatore from UC Irvine (10 goals).

Qualification
Since there has only ever been one single national championship for water polo, all NCAA men's water polo programs (whether from Division I, Division II, or Division III) were eligible. A total of 8 teams were invited to contest this championship.

Bracket
Site: Belmont Plaza Pool, Long Beach, California

{{8TeamBracket-Consols
| team-width=150
| RD3=First round
| RD4=Championship semifinals
| RD2=Consolation semifinals
| RD5=Championship
| RD5b=Third place
| RD1=Fifth place
| RD1b=Seventh place

| RD3-seed1= | RD3-team1=Stanford | RD3-score1=18
| RD3-seed2= | RD3-team2=Bucknell | RD3-score2=4
| RD3-seed3= | RD3-team3=UC Santa Barbara | RD3-score3=7| RD3-seed4= | RD3-team4=Long Beach State | RD3-score4=6
| RD3-seed5= | RD3-team5=UC Irvine | RD3-score5=15
| RD3-seed6= | RD3-team6=Brown | RD3-score6=8
| RD3-seed7= | RD3-team7=UCLA | RD3-score7=14
| RD3-seed8= | RD3-team8= Loyola–Chicago  | RD3-score8=6

| RD4-seed1= | RD4-team1=Stanford | RD4-score1=7
| RD4-seed2= | RD4-team2=UC Santa Barbara | RD4-score2=6
| RD4-seed3= | RD4-team3=UC Irvine | RD4-score3=7| RD4-seed4= | RD4-team4=UCLA | RD4-score4=6

| RD2-seed1= | RD2-team1=Bucknell | RD2-score1=4
| RD2-seed2= | RD2-team2=Long Beach State | RD2-score2=20
| RD2-seed3= | RD2-team3=Brown | RD2-score3=11
| RD2-seed4= | RD2-team4=Loyola–Chicago | RD2-score4=10

| RD5-seed1= | RD5-team1=Stanford (2OT) | RD5-score1=12
| RD5-seed2= | RD5-team2=UC Irvine | RD5-score2=11

| RD5b-seed1= | RD5b-team1=UC Santa Barbara | RD5b-score1=9
| RD5b-seed2= | RD5b-team2=UCLA | RD5b-score2=10

| RD1-seed1= | RD1-team1=Long Beach State | RD1-score1=13| RD1-seed2= | RD1-team2=Brown | RD1-score2=9

| RD1b-seed1= | RD1b-team1=Bucknell | RD1b-score1=8| RD1b-seed2= | RD1b-team2=Loyola–Chicago | RD1b-score2=6
}}

 All-tournament team Jeff Campbell, UC Irvine (Co-Most outstanding player)David Imbernino, Stanford''' (Co-Most outstanding player)
  John Anderson, UC Santa Barbara
Fernando Carsalade, UCLA
Phil Castillo, Long Beach State
Craig Klass, Stanford
Mark Maizel, UC Irvine
J.R. Salvatore, UC Irvine

See also 
 NCAA Men's Water Polo Championship

References

NCAA Men's Water Polo Championship
NCAA Men's Water Polo Championship
1985 in sports in California
December 1985 sports events in the United States
1985